The Battle of Zarumilla was a military confrontation between Peru and Ecuador that took place from July 23 to 31 during the 1941 Ecuadorian–Peruvian War.

Background
Hostilities between Peru and Ecuador began on July 5, 1941, when fire was exchanged between both parties. The events themselves, however, are disputed. According to Ecuador, a group of Peruvians, including policemen, crossed the Zarumilla River into Ecuadorian soil. The Peruvian policemen are then said to have fired first when a border patrol was spotted. According to Peru, the Ecuadorian Army shot first at local Civil Guard troops, which exchanged fire for 30 minutes, holding back a potential advance and waiting for reinforcements. After the 5th, hostilities along the border continued. As a result, on the night of July 6, the senior commander of the Ecuadorian Army ordered the formation of the 5th Infantry Brigade in El Oro, under the command of Colonel Luis Rodríguez.

Battle
The Peruvian offensive began on July 23, being carried out by the newly formed Northern Army Detachment headed by General Eloy G. Ureta with the purpose of pushing north into El Oro Province to prevent more skirmishes along the disputed border.

Quebrada Seca
On July 23, 1941, the 41st Peruvian Squadron took off from Tumbes to fulfill a mission, under the command of Lieutenant Commander Antonio Alberti and made up of Lieutenants Fernando Paraud, José A. Quiñones and Manuel Rivera, aboard their North American NA-50 or Toritos fighter planes. The mission consisted of bombing the Ecuadorian post of Quebrada Seca, where they had concentrated the bulk of their anti-aircraft artillery and placed machine guns.

According to Peruvian accounts, instead of parachuting to safety, Quiñones chose to sacrifice himself by crashing his damaged aircraft onto the Ecuadorian position, rendering the battery out of action. This version of events has been subsequently called into question by Ecuadorian military authorities, who have stated that there were no anti-aircraft guns in the area. The other planes that made up Squadron 41 continued with their mission and carried out a subsequent attack, returning to Tumbes.

Jambelí
The Peruvian destroyer Almirante Villar set sail from Zorritos with the mission of entering Ecuadorian waters and carrying out patrolling and reconnaissance tasks in the area. It was then that, being in the vicinity of the Jambelí channel, the Ecuadorian gunboat Abdón Calderón was spotted. The Ecuadorian ship, which was in transit to Guayaquil, turned 180º with respect to its course as soon as it recognized the Peruvian ship, fleeing towards Puerto Bolívar while firing shots. Admiral Villar did the same, maneuvering in circles avoiding getting too close to the coast due to its shallow depth. After 21 minutes of both sides exchanging fire, the incident ended.

Puerto Bolívar
On July 23, Peruvian aircraft carried out a strategic bombing of the port city. On the next day, aircraft returned to attack the Aviso Atahualpa patrol boat, located in the docks of the city. The fact that the patrol boat was the target as well as the subsequent defense of it carried out by Ecuadorian troops prevented valuable explosives located nearby from being attacked and ignited.

On July 28, Peruvian submarines  and  carried out a reconnaissance mission at the mouth of the Jambelí Strait in order to detect the presence of artillery. The following day, cruisers Coronel Bolognesi and Almirante Guise, during a patrol in front of the Jambelí Strait, bombed Punta Jambelí and Puerto Bolívar, in preparation for the Peruvian advance on El Oro.

On July 31st, prior to the cease fire that was to be effective on that date, an order was given to capture the city of Puerto Bolívar, which was accomplished using paratroopers from the newly formed Paratrooper Company of the Peruvian Air Force. The use of said paratroopers was decisive in the capture of the city and served as a surprise factor since, only a handful of countries had a unit of said type, such as Germany with their Fallschirmjäger, making Peru the first country in the Western Hemisphere to deploy paratroopers, being followed by Argentina in 1944.

Aftermath
After the ceasefire, a Civil Administration was established in the occupied Province of El Oro by Peru. A month later, on October 2, a bilateral ceasefire was signed which also established a demilitarized zone between both states.

By the time the ceasefire had been accepted, the cities bombarded by Peru included Santa Rosa, Machala and Puerto Bolívar. Peruvian aircraft had reached Guayaquil in at least two different occasions, but the squadron sent to the city limited itself to dropping propaganda leaflets, which were republished by Peruvian newspapers La Industria and El Tiempo.

A fire began in Santa Rosa on the 1st of August 1941, which destroyed over 120 houses.

The government of Ecuador, led by Dr. Carlos Alberto Arroyo del Río, signed the Rio de Janeiro Protocol on January 29, 1942, with which Ecuador officially renounced its claim to a sovereign outlet to the Amazon River.

On February 12, 1942, Peruvian troops vacated the Ecuadorian province of El Oro.

Gallery

See also
 Alerta en la frontera, a documentary film filmed during the war that went unreleased until 2014 due to the Rio de Janeiro Protocol

References

Bibliography

Notes

Ecuadorian–Peruvian War
1941 in Ecuador
1941 in Peru
Wars involving Peru
Wars involving Ecuador
Zarumilla
Zarumilla
Zarumilla